Town Hall railway station is a heritage-listed underground commuter rail station located in the centre of the Sydney central business district in New South Wales, Australia. The station opened on 28 February 1932. It is named after the Sydney Town Hall, located directly above the station.

History

The station is built on the site of Sydney's earliest colonial cemetery, the Old Sydney Burial Ground. In 2008, part of this cemetery was being excavated from under the Town Hall.

The station opened on 28 February 1932 and was built with six platforms, which were split over two levels with three platforms on each level. When the station opened, only four of the platforms were in use: platforms 1, 2 and 3 on the upper level and platform 6, served by escalators, on the lower level. The other two platforms were built in preparation for a proposed western suburbs line from the city to Gladesville, as envisaged under the Bradfield scheme. This line was never built, and the platforms (4 and 5) remained disused until incorporated into the Eastern Suburbs line when it opened in June 1979.

The station concourse had a major restructure in 2005 when the shops inside were closed to make way for the increasing crowds.

During a refurbishment of the station in 2014, a sign pointing to an air-raid shelter was uncovered on a staircase leading to Platforms 1 and 2. It has been encased in a Perspex casing.

Station configuration
Town Hall has two platform levels, each with three platforms – physically two island platforms, but set up so that one faces two tracks and the other faces the other track. Each platform has one lift in the centre connecting the concourse with the platforms, providing Easy Access for wheelchairs. These facilities were constructed during 2003–2004. The lower-level platforms (4-6) have 4 escalators to the concourse. As the platform is not wide enough, the escalators are in a cross configuration, with two at either end of the platform and another two at the centre. The escalator directions can be changed by staff throughout the day as the passenger flow dictates. The upper-level platforms have stairs up to the concourse. There are also small staircases linking the two platform levels.

The concourse is above the two platform levels and immediately below street level. The station is linked to nearby shopping centres including the Queen Victoria Building, The Galeries, Town Hall Square, Pavilion Plaza and, Woolworths Supermarket. There are also several exits up to each side of George Street.

When opened in 2024, the Sydney Metro line will include another station located at Pitt Street.

Platforms and services

Transport links
Town Hall station is served by bus routes operated by Busways Forest Coach Lines, Hillsbus, Transdev John Holland, Transdev and Transit Systems.

Trackplan

See also

Architecture of Sydney
 List of Sydney railway stations
 Railways in Sydney
 Rail transport in New South Wales
 Sydney underground railways

References

External links

Town Hall Station at Transport for New South Wales (Archived 2 May 2020)
Town Hall station map Transport for NSW

Easy Access railway stations in Sydney
Railway stations located underground in Sydney
Railway stations in Australia opened in 1932
George Street, Sydney
North Shore railway line
Eastern Suburbs railway line
Bankstown railway line
City Circle